The Gibson Hall is a Grade I listed building at 13 Bishopsgate in the City of London. Previously known as National Westminster Hall, the building is named after its architect, John Gibson.

Built of Portland stone in the classical style with engaged Corinthian columns, the building was commissioned as a new head office by the directors of the National Provincial Bank of England and completed in 1865.

Opening in 1866, there were only 4 arched bays and just seven figures stood atop. The additional 2 bay extension and rooftop figures, Shipbuilding and Mining, were added in 1878, relocating the figure for London so that it remained at the corner of the then newly extended building.

The exterior elevation features eight panels of allegorical scenes in high relief representing the achievements of mankind: the Arts, Commerce, Science, Manufactures, Agriculture, Navigation, Shipbuilding and Mining. Standing figures along the roof line represent various important cities in which the bank did business, including Manchester, Birmingham, Dover, Newcastle and London. The building was listed in 1950, for its special architectural and historic interest.

In 1967, National Provincial Bank moved its head office to Drapers Gardens, 12 Throgmorton Avenue. From the time of its disposal by National Westminster Bank in 1998 until recently, 13 Bishopsgate had been operating solely as an events hosting venue available for hire to the general public. It is currently closed and no longer listed as available as a venue for hire.

References

Grade I listed buildings in the City of London
Commercial buildings completed in 1865
Office buildings completed in 1865
Grade I listed banks
NatWest Group